Rachita Kumar (a.k.a. Rachita Kumar, born c1962) now known as Nandini Rachita Kumar was the winner of Miss India title in the year 1981. She later represented her country in the Miss Universe 1981. Her sister Suchita Kumar participated at Miss World in 1984.

Personal life
She got married and is currently living in Bangalore as a home maker.

References

Living people
Indian beauty pageant winners
1962 births
Miss Universe 1981 contestants